Mohd Nizam Abdul Razak (born 14 August 1983) is a Malaysian animator. He is best known as the creator and director of Malaysian animated series, BoBoiBoy and its franchise. He is one of the co-founders and Managing Director of Animonsta Studios, which is based in Cyberjaya. He is a graduate of Multimedia University, majoring in Film and Animation.

Personal life
Nizam Razak born in Johor Bahru, Johor and raised in Duyung, Central Malacca, Malacca. He has a younger sister. Nizam married Ezdiani Ahmad Fauzi in 2004 and blessed with three children, two boys and a girl.

Filmography

See also
 Animonsta Studios

References

External links
 

1983 births
Living people
People from Muar
People from Johor
Malaysian people of Malay descent
Malaysian Muslims
Malaysian animators
Malaysian animated film directors